Retzlaff, less commonly Retzlaw, is a surname. Although mainly found in German-speaking countries, it is derived from Slavic personal names Radoslav or Ratislav. Notable people with the surname include:

Brendon Retzlaff (born 1969), Australian rules footballer 
Bryce Retzlaff (born 1991), Australian rules football player
Charley Retzlaff (1904–1970), American heavyweight boxer 
Erich Retzlaff (1899–1993), German photographer
Misa Telefoni Retzlaff (born 1952), Samoan politician
Nick Retzlaff (born 1996), American soccer player 
Parker Retzlaff (born 2003), American race car driver
Pete Retzlaff (1931–2020), American football player and manager
Karl Retzlaw (1896–1979), German politician

References

See also
 
Ratzlaff
Retzlaff Farmstead

Surnames of Slavic origin